The Magic Circus Show was an entertainment show organised by the European Broadcasting Union (EBU) and host broadcaster Radio Télévision Suisse (RTS), which took place in 2010, 2011 and 2012. Children aged between seven and fourteen representing eight countries within the EBU membership area, performed a variety of circus acts at the Geneva Christmas Circus. The main show was also accompanied by the Magic Circus Show Orchestra.

The programme was recorded at the end of November each year in the tent of Circus Pajazzo in Chêne-Bougeries, a town just outside Geneva in Switzerland.

History
The idea to make a magic circus show, where circus acts are performed by children, belongs to the Swiss national television and radio company RTS and Damien Ottet, who is the executive producer of 7 Street Productions and the director of children's programs for RTS. They presented the idea of holding a contest at the Eurovision TV congress, and the European Broadcasting Union responded to their proposal. The event was officially launched by the EBU on 5 October 2010 at MIPCOM in Cannes, France.

Editions
In contrast to the other Eurovision programs, the Magic Circus Show was not a competition but a gala show and is recorded in advance and broadcast in the participating countries during the Christmas season.

2010
The 2010 Magic Circus Show was held on 26 November with six countries participating: Belgium, the Netherlands, Portugal, Russia, France and the hosts Switzerland.

2011
The 2011 Magic Circus Show took place on 26 November. Ukraine participated for the first time, so there were seven countries in total.

2012
The 2012 Magic Circus Show took place on 17 November. Nine countries participated. Bulgaria, Armenia and Ireland joined the show, however Ukraine decided to withdraw. This was the last edition of the Magic Circus Show.

Participation

Listed are all the countries that have ever taken part alongside the year in which they made their debut:

Hosting
Most of the expense of the contest is covered by commercial sponsors and contributions from the other participating nations. The contest is considered to be a unique opportunity for promoting the host country as a tourist destination. The table below shows a list of cities and venues that have hosted Magic Circus Show, one or more times.

Broadcast
The following broadcasters participated at least once:

  (ARMTV)
  (VRT)
  (BNT)
  (France 3)
  (RTÉ)
  (TROS)
  (RTP)
  (RTR)
  (RTS)
  (NTU)

The broadcasting rights for the inaugural show in 2010 were acquired by Belarus (BTRC), Italy (RAI), Slovenia (RTVSLO), TV5 Québec Canada and international francophone network, TV5Monde.

References

External links 
 EBU Press Release

Variety shows
Television magic shows
Circus
Entertainment events in Switzerland
Television shows set in Switzerland
Recurring events established in 2010
Recurring events disestablished in 2013
2010 in Switzerland
2011 in Switzerland
2012 in Switzerland
Events in Geneva
November 2010 events in Europe
November 2011 events in Europe
November 2012 events in Europe